Pyrgomantis simillima is a species of praying mantis found in Tanzania, Transvaal Province, and Zimbabwe.  It was originally identified as two separate species: Pyrgomantis curta (Beier, 1954) and Pyrgomantis simillima (also Beier, 1954).

See also
List of mantis genera and species

References

Pyrgomantis
Mantodea of Africa
Insects described in 1954